Compeer is a hamlet in east-central Alberta, Canada within Special Area No. 4. Previously an incorporated municipality, Compeer dissolved from village status on December 31, 1936, to become part of the Municipal District of Neutral Hills No. 331.

Compeer is located on an abandoned track of the Railink Central Western railway, north of Highway 12 and west of the Alberta–Saskatchewan border.

Founded in 1901, Compeer was a spot Aboriginals used to camp. Its literal meaning is camp here. When explorers came to Compeer, natives told them to camp here. Due to a misinterpretation, explorers thought the area was called Compeer.

Demographics 

Compeer recorded a population of 21 in the 1991 Census of Population conducted by Statistics Canada.

See also 
List of communities in Alberta
List of former urban municipalities in Alberta
List of hamlets in Alberta

References 

Hamlets in Alberta
Former villages in Alberta
Special Area No. 4